This is a list of vehicles that have been considered to be the result of badge engineering (rebadging), cloning, platform sharing, joint ventures between different car manufacturing companies, captive imports, or simply the practice of selling the same or similar cars in different markets (or even side-by-side in the same market) under different marques or model nameplates.

Current examples

Past examples

See also
 Car platform
 General Motors Companion Make Program
 Brand
 Rebranding
 Joint Venture
 List of Chrysler platforms
 List of Fiat platforms
 List of Ford platforms
 List of GM platforms
 List of Hyundai-Kia platforms
 List of Mitsubishi platforms
 List of Nissan platforms
 List of Toyota platforms
 List of Volkswagen Group platforms

References

Badge engineered